Ezinne Akudo Anyaoha (born 17 May 1990) is a Nigerian lawyer and beauty queen.

Early life
Akudo was born in Imo State. She graduated from Federal Government Girls' College, Owerri Imo State, and earned a law degree at Abia State University, subsequently completing the mandatory National Youth Service Corp in Ogun State.

Career
In 2013, Akudo won the Miss Nigeria beauty pageant.  

In 2015, Akudo started her career as a lawyer.  and set up a rape crisis center through her non-governmental organization; The Eight Foundation based in Lagos, Nigeria. She has also been active in campaigning against sexual violence.

In 2018, Akudo was appointed Creative Director of the Miss Nigeria Pageant.

References

Igbo people
1990 births
Nigerian women lawyers
Abia State University alumni
Miss Nigeria winners
Sexual abuse victim advocates
Nigerian women activists
21st-century Nigerian lawyers
Nigerian women's rights activists
People from Imo State
Living people
21st-century women lawyers